Farm World is a weekly United States farming technology magazine that has been published 51 weeks a year, every Wednesday, since 1955 and is owned by MidCountry Media, Inc., who bought it from Daily Mail and General Trust in 2009. The magazine has its headquarters both in Indiana and Illinois.

Farm World is a regional news and information source for farmers and agribusinesses in Indiana, Ohio, Illinois, Michigan, Kentucky and Tennessee.

Farm World’s weekly features include:
 regional classified ads
 regional farm news
 calendar of events
 auction listings

In depth news articles cover a range of interests including:
 regional county fairs
 FFA
 4-H
 Young Farmers
 agricultural politics
 market prices
 animal health
 crop and livestock management.

Special sections focus on women's features, recipes, auction and show reviews, farm safety, rural living, agricultural research and new farming technologies.

References

External links 
 Official Website.

Agricultural magazines
News magazines published in the United States
Weekly magazines published in the United States
Magazines established in 1955
Professional and trade magazines
Magazines published in Illinois
Magazines published in Indiana
1955 establishments in the United States